Eragrostis dielsii, commonly known as mallee lovegrass, is a species of grass in the family Poaceae that is endemic to Australia.

Description
It grows as an annual or short-lived perennial tuft up to 40 centimetres high with erect, spreading culms. Flowers are green and purple, and occur in panicles.

Taxonomy
This species was first published in 1904 by Robert Knud Friedrich Pilger, based on specimens collected in the vicinity of Carnarvon, Western Australia. A number of varieties and forms have been published since then, but none are currently maintained.

Distribution and habitat
It is widespread in Australia, occurring in every mainland state. It is often found in mallee vegetation. It favours light clay soils, but is also found growing in sands, loams, and limestone soils.

References

dielsii
Poales of Australia
Angiosperms of Western Australia
Flora of South Australia
Flora of the Northern Territory
Flora of Queensland
Flora of New South Wales
Flora of Victoria (Australia)